South Peru is a neighborhood within Peru, Indiana in Washington Township, Miami County.

History
South Peru was platted in 1873. The community was so named from its location across the Wabash River from Peru. By 1887, South Peru contained a sawmill, several shops, a brewery and a couple saloons.

South Peru was annexed by Peru in 1914.

Geography
South Peru is situated in the northern part of Washington Township and is separated from the city of Peru by the Wabash River.

References

Populated places in Miami County, Indiana